Reigen may refer to:

 Reigen (play) or La Ronde, a 1900 play by Arthur Schnitzler
 Reigen (film), a 1973 adaptation directed by Otto Schenk
 Reigen (opera), a 1993 adaptation by Philippe Boesmans
 Emperor Reigen, 112th emperor of Japan
 Reigen, spin-off manga of Mob Psycho 100.
 Reigen (singer) (born 1985), American singer-songwriter